Linden Vey (born July 17, 1991) is a Canadian professional ice hockey right winger currently playing for Barys Astana of the Kontinental Hockey League (KHL). Vey previously played in the National Hockey League (NHL) for the Calgary Flames, Vancouver Canucks and the Los Angeles Kings, the latter of which drafted him in the fourth round, 96th overall, in the 2009 NHL Entry Draft.

Playing career
On June 28, 2014, Vey was traded by the Los Angeles Kings to the Vancouver Canucks in exchange for a second-round pick at the 2014 NHL Entry Draft (ultimately used to select Roland McKeown). He scored his first NHL goal on October 11, 2014, against Viktor Fasth of the Edmonton Oilers. On October 5, 2015, Vey was placed on waivers by the Canucks. He cleared waivers the following day and was assigned to the Utica Comets of the American Hockey League (AHL).

On July 5, 2016, Vey signed a one-year, two-way deal as a free agent with the Calgary Flames. Vey was assigned to Calgary's AHL affiliate, the Stockton Heat, to begin the 2016–17 season. As the team's top scorer, he scored 55 points in 61 games but was limited to just four scoreless games in his recall to the Flames.

On July 2, 2017, Vey signed a contract abroad in agreeing to a one-year deal with Kazakh-based club Barys Astana of the Kontinental Hockey League (KHL). Despite scoring 52 points in 50 games, Barys Astana missed the playoffs. As a result, Vey was granted his release and signed with ZSC Lions of the Swiss National League (NL) on January 18, 2018. He played out the remainder of the season with the Lions, helping retain the Swiss championship.

On May 3, 2018, Vey opted to return to the KHL, signing a two-year contract as a free agent with CSKA Moscow. In his first season with CSKA, Vey contributed with 31 assists and 43 points in 56 regular season games. He compiled 10 points in 18 playoff games to help CSKA claim the Gagarin Cup.

At the conclusion of his contract with CSKA, Vey was signed as a free agent to a two-year contract with SKA Saint Petersburg, on May 16, 2020.

International play

During the 2017–18 season, Vey was selected to represent Canada at the 2018 Winter Olympics in Pyeongchang, South Korea. Used in a depth role, Vey contributed with one assist in six games to help Canada claim the bronze medal.

Personal life
On June 5, 2016, Vey's father, Curtis and his mistress, Angela Nicholson, were convicted of conspiracy to commit murder. The targets of the plot were Vey's mother, Brigitte, as well as Nicholson's husband. They were acquitted after a retrial in May 2019.

Career statistics

Regular season and playoffs

International

Awards and honours

References

External links

1991 births
Living people
Barys Nur-Sultan players
Calgary Flames players
HC CSKA Moscow players
Ice hockey people from Saskatchewan
Los Angeles Kings draft picks
Los Angeles Kings players
Manchester Monarchs (AHL) players
Medicine Hat Tigers players
Olympic ice hockey players of Canada
Ice hockey players at the 2018 Winter Olympics
Olympic bronze medalists for Canada
Medalists at the 2018 Winter Olympics
Olympic medalists in ice hockey
SKA Saint Petersburg players
Stanley Cup champions
Stockton Heat players
Utica Comets players
Vancouver Canucks players
People from Wakaw, Saskatchewan
ZSC Lions players
Canadian expatriate ice hockey players in Russia
Canadian expatriate ice hockey players in Switzerland
Canadian ice hockey centres
Canadian ice hockey right wingers